The Burmese roofed turtle (Batagur trivittata) is one of six turtle species in the genus Batagur of the family Geoemydidae.
It is a freshwater turtle endemic to Myanmar and was thought to be extinct until rediscovered in 2002. Less than individuals were known by 2018.

The female Burmese roofed turtle grows significantly larger than the male; the male's usually green head transforms during the breeding season to a bright chartreuse-yellow with bold black markings.

In 2007, an illegally traded individual was seen in Qingping market in Guangzhou, China.

Conservation 
The Burmese roofed turtle is nationally protected and listed in CITES Appendix II. The captive population in five zoos comprised about 1,000 individuals as of 2018.
Several hundred Burmese roofed turtles are kept in the Yadanabon Zoological Gardens in Mandalay and a turtle conservation center in Lawkananda Park, Bagan. Some have been released to the wild. In the years that followed, researchers found several specimens of the Burmese roofed turtle and took them to captivity.

References

External links 

Batagur
Reptiles of Myanmar
Endemic fauna of Myanmar
Reptiles described in 1835
Taxa named by André Marie Constant Duméril
Taxonomy articles created by Polbot